The Wilderness Travel Course (also known as WTC) is a Sierra Club program that teaches basic mountaineering skills to students.

The class is a 10-week introduction to all-around outdoor proficiency, gives participants a taste of backpacking, equipment, snow travel, field navigation, wilderness ethics, basic rock climbing, mountaineering medicine, winter camping, general safety and rescue techniques.

References

Wilderness
Sierra Club